The History of Shanghai expo began when numerous scholars and government officials envisioned China would one day join the world community in hosting an international global expos.  Different governments have gained international experience in participating in fairs outside China. It wasn't until the later 20th century when the participation and hosting became more regular.

Outside participations

Early unofficial participations
In 1851, a Cantonese business man in Shanghai, Xu Rong-cun (徐榮村) heard of the news of The Great Exhibition.  He hurriedly grabbed 12 bags of silk and brought it to London in a long trip.  Queen Victoria herself even awarded Xu with a golden award.  During that 1851 London expo, Henry Courtney Selous did a number of paintings for the event. According to one of the painting at the Crystal Palace, a Chinese person by the name of  Xi-sheng (希生) was wearing a Qing government official outfit and represented China.  Later this person was investigated to be from Guangdong and was not actually a government official.  He happened to be from a boat called (耆英號).  The participants were the first from China to take part in the expo experience.  They were not official.

Official participation
The Qing dynasty first officially participated in the 1876 Philadelphia Centennial Exposition, then continued in 1904 in the St Louis Louisiana Purchase Exposition.  The Republic of China participated in the 1915 Panama–Pacific International Exposition.  China did not participate in another expo until the 1982 World's Fair, a 67-year gap.

Hosting vision

In 1893 a Qing representative from Xiangshan County, Guangdong named Cheng Guan-ying (鄭觀應) wrote a book called (盛世危言) regarding everything from economy, military, diplomacy and culture.  The book also mentioned the idea of a "world's fair".  It was later read by the Qing dynasty Guangxu Emperor who recommended printing 2000 copies of it.  The book later expanded to other countries outside China.  In the book, Cheng recommended Shanghai as the place to hold the fair as he recognized it as a place of east and west.

In 1902 scholar Liang Qichao (梁啟超) also mentioned the idea of an expo in a book called The Future of New China (新中國未來記).  He even went to the Louisiana Purchase Exposition in the United States in 1904.

In the ancient town of Zhujiajiao (朱家角古鎮) in Shanghai, a scholar by the name of Lu Shi-è (陸士諤) wrote a book in 1910 called New China (新中國) with a vision of a 10,000 nations exposition held in Pudong, Shanghai, China.

In the Republic of China era, Sun Yat-sen wrote in a country development strategy collection titled (建國方略).  One of the book pointed out Shanghai was in the position to host.  In the late 1930s and 1940s the Sino-Japanese war and Chinese Civil war broke out along with many other events.  All expo hosting plans were postponed.  It wasn't until after 1979 when Deng Xiaoping revisited the world expo idea again.

Hosting previous fairs
A number of specialized world fairs of much smaller scale have appeared in China before.  The first of which is the Qing dynasty Nanyang industrial exposition, also referred to internationally as the Nanking Exposition.  The Republic of China government has tried numerous times to host a fair since 1920.  They did not succeed until the 1929 Westlake exposition.

Since then the successful hosting of the 1999 World Horticultural Exposition in Kunming was a key event that brought modern hosting experience into China and eventually led to the Shanghai bid.  On November 18, 1999, the Chinese government officially decided that Shanghai would bid for the 2010 World Expo.  The city would win the bid on December 3, 2002 at the 132nd General Assembly of the International Exhibitions Bureau.  The 2010 Shanghai Expo is exactly 100 years from 1910 when Lu Shi-è (陸士諤) envisioned the expo to be hosted in the city.

See also
 List of world's fairs
 List of world expositions

References

History of Shanghai
Expo 2010